Dow Ab-e Zivdar (also Romanized as Dow Āb-e Zīvdār; also known as Dow Āb) is a village in Afrineh Rural District, Mamulan District, Pol-e Dokhtar County, Lorestan Province, Iran. At the 2006 census, its population was 96, and it included 20 households.

References 

Towns and villages in Pol-e Dokhtar County